Heinz Stanske (2 December 1909 – 1996) was a German violinist and music pedagogue.

Life and career 
Born in Berlin, Stanske studied in his hometown and Milan. He started his career as a violin soloist in 1938.

From 1944 to 1955, he led a master class at the Hochschule für Kirchenmusik Heidelberg. From 1955 he taught at the Hochschule für Musik Karlsruhe, from 1959 at the Frankfurt University of Music and Performing Arts. In 1962, he was appointed Professor there.

Since 1950, Stanske was a special concertmaster of the Südwestfunk orchestra in Baden-Baden.

Edith Peinemann was one of his students.

Sources

References

External links 
 
 
 

German classical violinists
Male classical violinists
German music educators
Academic staff of the Frankfurt University of Music and Performing Arts
1909 births
1996 deaths
Musicians from Berlin
20th-century German male musicians
German expatriates in Italy